Željko Kosanović (born 19 August 1934) is a former Croatian basketball and handball player.

He is the brother of Simeon Kosanović.

Honours
Lokomotiva 
Croatian Republic League (1): 1952

Primorje
Croatian Primorje League - Rijeka group (1): 1957-58
Primorje and Istra Regional League (2): 1958-59, 1959-60

Kvarner
Regional League of Rijeka and Karlovac (1): 1963-64
Regional League of Croatia (primorje) (1): 1964-65

Partizan Zamet
Regional League of Primorje and Karlovac (1): 1965-66

Sources
Petar Orgulić - 50 godina rukometa u Rijeci (2005), Adria public

References

Yugoslav male handball players
RK Zamet players
People from Karlovac County
Handball players from Rijeka
RK Kvarner players
1934 births
Living people